Countries belonging to the Commonwealth of Nations exchange High Commissioners rather than Ambassadors. Though there are a few technical differences (for instance, whereas Ambassadors present their diplomatic credentials to the host country's head of state, High Commissioners are accredited to the head of government), they are in practice the same office. The following persons have served as British High Commissioner to India.

High Commissioner to British India (1946–1947)

1946–1947: Sir Terence Shone

High Commissioner to the Dominion of India (1947–1950)

1947–1948: Sir Terence Shone
1948–1950: Sir Archibald Nye

High Commissioner to the Republic of India (1950–present)

1950–1952: Sir Archibald Edward Nye
1952–1955: Sir Alexander Clutterbuck
1955–1960: Malcolm MacDonald
1960–1965: Sir Paul Gore-Booth
1965–1968: John Freeman
1968–1971: Sir Morrice James
1971–1973: Sir Terence Garvey
1974–1976: Sir Michael Walker
1977–1982: Sir John Thomson
1982–1987: Sir Robert Wade-Gery
1987–1991: Sir David Goodall
1991–1996: Sir Nicholas Fenn
1996–1998: Sir David Gore-Booth
1999–2003: Sir Rob Young
2003–2007: Sir Michael Arthur
2007–2011: Sir Richard Stagg
2011–2015: Sir James Bevan
2016-2020: Sir Dominic Asquith
2020–2021: Sir Philip Barton
2021–: Alexander Ellis

See also

British High Commission New Delhi

References

External links

UK and India, www.gov.uk

India
 
United Kingdom
India and the Commonwealth of Nations
United Kingdom and the Commonwealth of Nations